Mike Torchia (born February 23, 1972) is a Canadian former professional ice hockey goaltender.

Biography
Torchia was born in Toronto, Ontario. As a youth, he played in the 1985 Quebec International Pee-Wee Hockey Tournament with the Toronto Marlboros minor ice hockey team. He played on the same backyard rink with Eric Lindros growing up as a kid in Toronto.

Torchia was named to the Memorial Cup All-Star Team in 1990, and won the Hap Emms Memorial Trophy at the 1990 Memorial Cup. He was also named an Ontario Hockey League first team all-star in 1991.

Torchia was drafted 74th overall by the Minnesota North Stars in the 1991 NHL Entry Draft. In his six career National Hockey League games for the Dallas Stars during the 1994–95 NHL season, he registered a record of three wins, two losses, and one tie with a GAA of 3.30 and an .895 save percentage.

Torchia was named to the ISL Second All-Star team in 2001.

Torchia was later a colour commentator for the Kitchener Rangers on 570 News.

Career statistics

Regular season

Post season

International

References

External links

1972 births
Living people
Baltimore Bandits players
Birmingham Bulls (ECHL) players
Canadian expatriate ice hockey players in England
Canadian ice hockey goaltenders
Dallas Stars players
Fort Wayne Komets players
Guildford Flames players
Hampton Roads Admirals players
Kalamazoo Wings (1974–2000) players
Kitchener Rangers players
Milwaukee Admirals (IHL) players
Minnesota North Stars draft picks
Mohawk Valley Prowlers players
Orlando Solar Bears (IHL) players
Peoria Rivermen (ECHL) players
Portland Pirates players
San Antonio Dragons players
Sheffield Steelers players
Ice hockey people from Toronto